Turbinaria is a genus of brown algae (Phaeophyceae) found primarily in tropical marine waters. It generally grows on rocky substrates. In tropical Turbinaria species that are often preferentially consumed by herbivorous fishes and echinoids, there is a relatively low level of phenolics and tannins.

The genus has shown promise as a way of removing lead from aqueous solutions.

Taxonomy and Nomenclature 
Turbinaria J.V. Lamouroux is a genus under family Sargassaceae, order Fucales, of the class Phaeophyceae (brown algae). Taxonomic classification is based on morphological characteristics including the shape of the leaves, vesicles, and receptacles, as well as the development of the axes. The genus has received comparatively lesser attention than other genera under Sargassaceae, and like many seaweeds, the large degree of phenotypic plasticity exhibited by different species has led to many taxonomic uncertainties. The use of molecular analyses has been useful in this regard.

Morphology 

Turbinaria is characterized by an upright thallus with radially branched axes bearing blades.  It has a tough texture. The blades come in various forms described as stipitate, turbinate, crowned, and obpyramidal. Its appearance resembles that of a long pinecone. The thallus is kept upright by a holdfast consisting of spread out branches growing from the main axes. Mature thalli possess receptacles, their reproductive organs which branch out from the tips of the stalks on the blades.

Distribution 
Turbinaria is mainly distributed in tropical coral reefs but is also found in the subtropics and temperate regions. Southeast Asia as well as the Indian Ocean contain the highest diversity of the genus. Turbinaria ornata is the species with the widest distribution within the genus, ranging from the West Atlantic, to the Indo-Pacific, and East Africa.

Ecology 
The genus can survive in various habitats such as tide pools, rocky intertidal zones, and forereefs, as well as up to depths of 30 meters, as well as in habitats will varying levels of exposure. They have adapted different forms to suit their environments. Thalli in habitats with high wave action tend to be shorter, tougher, and not buoyant which helps them withstand the harsh conditions. On the other hand, thalli in more sheltered habitats are longer, with weaker tissue, and develop buoyancy with sexual maturity.

Turbinaria is one of the principal genera of macroalgae that have been observed to take over degraded reefs following losses in hard coral cover. One of the reasons for this is that it has a higher thermal tolerance than some coral species giving it a competitive advantage during periods of high temperatures. Its thalli can also cause abrasions on corals which can lead to death.

Life History 
Species like Turbinaria ornata are monoecious and reproduce both sexually and asexually. The life cycle begins with a diploid thallus which releases haploid gametes which develop in its receptacles which contain oogonia for eggs, and antheridia for antherozoids. Fertilization occurs at the tip of the receptacle which results in a diploid zygote. Asexual reproduction occurs via fragmentation and dispersal. Dispersal occurs in two modes: short ( < 1 m) and long distance (kms).

Harvesting/Cultivation 
Harvesting of Turbinaria is largely done by collecting drifting thalli on the water surface or directly from the substratum. The genus is commonly harvested in India, Indonesia, and the Philippines for alginate production. It is abundant year-round in French Polynesia and India, and is harvested seasonally in Indonesia.

Chemical Composition 
Turbinaria contains fucoxanthin which is a carotenoid pigment found in all brown algae. Its functions lie in the harvesting of light and energy transfer. The genus has high levels of iron (893.7 ± 210.5 g−1 µg dry weight), and has an affinity for arsenic and nickel, depending on the concentrations in the environments in which they grow. It also has good potential for alginate production since it can yield up to 40% of its dry weight in alginate. Turbinaria also contains fucoidan, a sulfated polysaccharide with antioxidant, anti-inflammatory, and anticancer properties.

The Genus Turbinaria is still chemically and pharmacologically underexplored. These brown algae belong to the family Sargassaceae. Therapeutic potentials of pure compounds isolated from the Genus Turbinaria are extraordinarily promising as antiproliferative, antipyretic, anti-inflammatory immunostimulatory, anti-diabetic, anti-obesity, antiviral, antimicrobial, cardioprotective, hepatoprotective and hypolipidemic. Those activities are represented by diverse classes of compounds including sterols, amino acids, fatty acids, alcohols, halocarbons, hydrocarbons, carbohydrates, esters and cyclic tetrapyrrole compounds.

Utilization 
Turbinaria is utilized for its alginate extracts, which are used as thickening, gelling, and stabilizing agents in food and drinks, as well as in cosmetics and pharmaceutical products. The young thalli of Turbinaria ornata are consumed in Indonesia either fresh, salted, or with curry sauce. Dried Turbinaria can be ground and used as seasoning. In Samoa, it is used as a stir-fry ingredient. Brown algae are often used in animal feed as they can provide nutritional supplements and improve growth. A study found that prawn feeds containing T. ornata supplements increased growth, survival, and digestion. Turbinaria is also used as fertilizer and pesticides in many Asian countries.

Species 

AlgaeBase lists 32 current species of Turbinaria.:

 Turbinaria capensis Pichon (not accepted by WoRMS)
 Turbinaria condensata Sonder, 1860
 Turbinaria conoides (J.Agardh) Kützing, 1860
 Turbinaria conoides f. laticuspidata
 Turbinaria conoides f. retroflexa
 Turbinaria costata E.S.Barton 1966
 Turbinaria crateriformis W.R.Taylor, 1966
 Turbinaria decurrens Bory de Saint-Vincent, 1828
 Turbinaria denudata Bory de Saint-Vincent, 1828
 Turbinaria elatensis W.R.Taylor, 1965
 Turbinaria filamentosa Yamada, 1925 
 Turbinaria foliosa M.J. Wynne, 2002
 Turbinaria filiformis Yamada (not accepted by WoRMS)
 Turbinaria foliosa M.J.Wynne, 2002
 Turbinaria gracilis Sonder, 1845
 Turbinaria havanensis J.V.Lamouroux (not accepted by WoRMS)
 Turbinaria heterophylla Kützing, 1860
 Turbinaria indica Gopalakrishnan, 1974
 Turbinaria kenyaensis W.R.Taylor, 1966
 Turbinaria luzonensis W.R.Taylor, 1964
 Turbinaria membranacea Ruprecht (not accepted by WoRMS)
 Turbinaria murrayana E.S.Barton, 1891
 Turbinaria ornata (Turner) J.Agardh, 1848
 Turbinaria ornata f. ecoronata
 Turbinaria ornata f. evesiculosa
 Turbinaria ornata f. hainanensis
 Turbinaria ornata var. serrata
 Turbinaria papenfussii W.R.Taylor, 1964
 Turbinaria parvifolia C.K.Tseng & Lu, 1983
 Turbinaria swartzii (C. Agardh) Yendo, 1905
 Turbinaria tanzaniensis Jaasund, 1976
 Turbinaria tetraedra Ruprecht (not accepted by WoRMS)
 Turbinaria thunbergii (Mertens ex Roth) Yendo, 1905
 Turbinaria trialata (J. Agardh) Kützing, 1860
 Turbinaria tricostata E.S.Barton, 1891
 Turbinaria tricostata var. weberae
 Turbinaria triquetra (J.Agardh) Kützing, 1849
 Turbinaria turbinata (Linnaeus) Kuntze, 1898 (type species)
 Turbinaria vulgaris J.Agardh, 1848

References

Fucales
Fucales genera